Güldencrone, also spelled Guldencrone and Gyldenkrone, is a Danish and Norwegian noble family with the rank of fief baron.

Lineage
Vilhelm Marselis (1643–1683), who belonged to a 17th-century family prominent within Danish financial circles, was in 1673 raised up to the baronial estate with the name Güldencrone. As Fief Baron Güldencrone, he held the Barony Vilhelmsborg in Aarhus. His son, Christian Baron Güldencrone (1676–1746), was the father of Wilhelm Baron Güldencrone (1701–1747), Jens Baron Güldencrone (1712–1770), and Matthias Baron Güldencrone (1703–1753), the latter of whose son was Christian Frederik Baron Güldencrone (1741–1788).

Christian Frederik Baron Güldencrone's sons were Frederik Julius Christian Baron Güldencrone (1765–1824) and Wilhelm Baron Güldencrone (1768–1806), among whose sons were Ove Christian Ludvig Emerentius Baron Güldencrone (1795–1863) and Christian Frederik Baron Güldencrone (1803–1875), who was the father of Christian Baron Güldencrone (1837–1902) and Ove Baron Güldencrone (1840–1880). Ove Baron Güldencrone was an aide-de-camp of King George I of Greece, and in 1877, he presided over the creation of the Greek Navy's torpedo boat fleet.

Emil Gyldenkrone has married Lona, an opera singer.
Ode of Güldencrone has married Diane, a historian.

See also
 Danish nobility
 Norwegian nobility

References

Literature and sources
 Wikipedia, Danish: Güldencrone (Per 15 April 2011.)
 Dansk biografisk leksikon [Danish Biographical Encyclopædia].
 Fabritius, Albert: Güldencrone
 A. Thiset og P.L. Wittrup: Nyt dansk Adelslexikon, Copenhagen 1904 
 Sven Tito Achen: Danske adelsvåbener, Copenhagen 1973

Danish families
Danish noble families
Norwegian families
Norwegian noble families